Monika Fludernik (born 1957), a native Austrian, is professor of English literature and culture at the Albert Ludwigs University of Freiburg, Germany.

Fludernik earned her doctorate at the University of Graz, Austria, where she studied with professor Franz Karl Stanzel. In 1984, she took up an associate professorship at the University of Vienna, and since 1994 she has been a full professor at Freiburg. Fludernik has held several temporary fellowships, at the Universities of Oxford, and Harvard, among other places, and she is a corresponding member of the Austrian Academy of Sciences. Since 2008 she is also a member of Academia Europaea.

Fludernik is renowned for her contribution to several fields of literary theory, particularly that of narratology, but also to postcolonial literary criticism, eighteenth-century aesthetics, and law and literature studies. She has also published on metaphor and, more recently, on otium (leisure) as part of the  collaborative research centre on otium funded by the German Research Foundation.

Works

Besides being sole author of 6 books (see below), Fludernik has published more than 100 scientific articles and has edited and co-edited several volumes of books/special issues of scientific journals.

Books:

  Metaphors of Confinement: The Prison in Fact, Fiction, and Fantasy. Oxford: Oxford Univ. Press, 2019.
 Introduction to Narratology, London/New York: Routledge, 2009.
 Einführung in die Erzähltheorie. Darmstadt: Wissenschaftliche Buchgesellschaft, 2006.
 Echoes and Mirrorings: Gabriel Josipovici’s Creative Oeuvre. Frankfurt/New York: Lang, 2000.
 Towards a ‘Natural’ Narratology. London/New York: Routledge, 1996.
 The Fictions of Language and the Languages of Fiction: The Linguistic Representation of Speech and Consciousness. London/New York: Routledge, 1993.

Edited books:

 Ed., together with Marie-Laure Ryan. Narrative Factuality: A Handbook. Revisionen. Berlin: de Gruyter, 2019.
 Ed., together with Jan Alber. Postclassical Narratology: Approaches and Analyses. Columbus, OH: Ohio State Univ. Press, 2016. Paperpack edition.
 Ed., together with Miriam Nandi. Idleness, Indolence and Leisure in British Literature. Basingstoke: Palgrave, 2014.
 Ed. Beyond Cognitive Metaphor Theory: Perspectives on Literary Metaphor. Routledge Studies in Rhetoric and Stylistics, 3. London: Routledge, 2011.
 Ed., together with Greta Olson. In the Grip of the Law: Prisons, Trials and the Space Between. Frankfurt/New York: Lang, 2004.
 Ed. Diaspora and Multiculturalism: Common Traditions and New Developments. Readings in the Post/Colonial Literatures in English, 66. Amsterdam: Rodopi, 2003.
 Ed. Hybridity and Postcolonialism: Twentieth-Century Indian Literature. Tubingen: Stauffenburg, 1998.

References

External links 
 Monika Fludernik's Homepage.
 Fludernik's works in the  British Library Catalogue.
 Reinhart Koselleck Project "Diachronic Narratology" on the  University of Freiburg website and the website of  DFG.

German literary critics
German women literary critics
Austrian women academics
Austrian literary critics
Austrian women literary critics
Harvard University staff
Academic staff of the University of Vienna
University of Graz alumni
Austrian expatriates in Germany
Austrian expatriates in England
Writers from Graz
Living people
1957 births